The EU–Vietnam Free Trade Agreement (EVFTA) is a free trade agreement between the European Union (EU) and the Socialist Republic of Vietnam. The EU-Vietnam Investment Protection Agreement (EVIPA) was also agreed which is a bilateral investment treaty.

The agreement deepens the Vietnam–European Union relations and was adopted by Council Decision (EU) 2020/753 of March 30, 2020 on the conclusion of the free trade agreement between the EU and Vietnam. The agreement was passed in Vietnam on June 8, 2020, in the Vietnamese National Assembly and entered into force on August 1 of that year. Both agreements were approved by Vietnam's lawmakers with a large majority of around 95% of the vote.

According to the European Commission, the agreements will provide opportunities to increase trade and support jobs and growth on both sides, through

 Eliminating  99% of all tariffs
 Reducing  regulatory barriers and overlapping red tape
 Ensuring  protection of geographical indications
 Opening  up services and public procurement markets
 Making  sure the agreed rules are enforceable

See also 

 United Kingdom–Vietnam Free Trade Agreement: a similar free trade agreement between the UK and Vietnam. It is largely derived from EVFTA with minor modifications and was made to continue the rights and obligations between the two countries after Brexit.

 European Union free trade agreements

References

External links 

 GUIDE TO THE EU-VIETNAM TRADE AND INVESTMENT AGREEMENTS

Treaties entered into by the European Union
Treaties of Vietnam
Free trade agreements of the European Union
Free trade agreements of Vietnam
Treaties concluded in 2019
Treaties entered into force in 2020